This is a list of football clubs in Mexico. Currently the governing body of football in Mexico is the Mexican Football Federation (FMF), which is in charge of its national teams and its leagues, with the highest one being the Liga MX. FMF was founded in 1927 and is a member of both FIFA and CONCACAF. The newly instituted Liga de Balompié Mexicano is unrecognized by FIFA, however, it is in CONIFA membership.

Liga MX

Liga MX teams 2022–23 season

Liga de Expansión MX

Liga de Expansión MX teams 2022–23 season

Liga Premier

Serie A teams 2022–23 season

Group 1

Group 2

Group 3

Serie B teams 2022–23 season

Liga TDP

Liga de Balompié Mexicano

Liga de Balompié Mexicano teams 2022 season
Note: Subject to change.

References

 
Mexico
Clubs
Football clubs